27 Hydrae is a member of a triple star system system in the equatorial constellation of Hydra, located 222 light years away from the Sun. It is visible to the naked eye as a faint, orange-hued star with a combined apparent visual magnitude of 4.82. The system is moving further from the Earth with a heliocentric radial velocity of +25.6 km/s.

The magnitude 4.91 primary, component A, is an aging giant star with a stellar classification of K0 III. It is a red clump giant, which indicates it is on the horizontal branch and is generating energy through helium fusion at its core. The star is 1.9 billion years old with 2.17 times the mass of the Sun. It has swelled to 11 times the Sun's radius and is radiating 57.5 times the Sun's luminosity from its enlarged photosphere at an effective temperature of 4,965 K. The star is suspected to host a low-mass companion.

The brighter member of the pair, component B, is a seventh magnitude F-type main-sequence star with a class of F4 V, while its companion is an eleventh magnitude K-type main-sequence star with a class of K2 V.

Substellar companion

The Okayama Planet Search team published a paper in late 2008 reporting investigations into radial velocity variations observed for a set of evolved stars, showing hints of a substellar companion orbiting the primary member of the wide binary system 27 Hydrae. Its orbital period is estimated at 9.3 years, but no planet has been confirmed yet.

References

K-type giants
F-type main-sequence stars
K-type main-sequence stars
Horizontal-branch stars
Triple star systems
Hypothetical planetary systems
Hydra (constellation)
Hydrae, P
Durchmusterung objects
Hydrae, 27
080586
045811
3709